Gerald "Jerry" Wunsch (born January 21, 1974) is a former American college and professional football player who was an offensive tackle in the National Football League (NFL) for eight seasons during the 1990s and early 2000s. He played college football for the University of Wisconsin and played professionally for the Tampa Bay Buccaneers and Seattle Seahawks of the NFL.

Early life
Wunsch was born in Eau Claire, Wisconsin and played high school football at Wausau West High School. He played college football at University of Wisconsin–Madison. In his senior year, he was awarded first-team All-Big Ten honors after starting every game as right tackle.

Professional career
Wunsch was drafted by the Tampa Bay Buccaneers in the 2nd round of the 1997 NFL Draft.
 He played for Tampa Bay for five seasons before being cut in 2002. Wunsch then played for the Seattle Seahawks for three seasons.

Life after the NFL
Wunsch actively volunteered in Wisconsin while he played professionally, and after retirement he moved to the Tampa Bay area to work with the Wunsch Family Foundation full-time. The Foundation works with children who have cancer and chronic blood disorders. Wunsch and his  family live in Clearwater, Florida.

References

External links
 
Circle of Friends: Wunsch Family Foundation
The Seattle Times: Hawks Q&A: Faith in self, family support guide Wunsch

1974 births
Living people
American football offensive tackles
American football offensive guards
Tampa Bay Buccaneers players
Seattle Seahawks players
Wisconsin Badgers football players
Sportspeople from Wausau, Wisconsin
Sportspeople from Eau Claire, Wisconsin
Players of American football from Wisconsin
Ed Block Courage Award recipients